Harrigan may refer to:

Harrigan (surname)
Harrigan (TV series), Canadian children's television series
Hop Harrigan, comic-strip aviator
"Big John" Harrigan, nurturing pedophile in film L.I.E.
"Harrigan" (song), by George M. Cohan from Fifty Miles From Boston
Harrigan and Son, a 1960–1961 ABC situation comedy starring Pat O'Brien and Roger Perry, which used Cohan's song as its theme tune
Harrigan, N.Y., part of Ellenburg, New York
Harrigan (film), a British crime drama film